The Ugly Duckling is a 1920 British silent comedy film directed by Alexander Butler and starring Albert Ray, Florence Turner and Maudie Dunham. It was one of several films made by the British producer G.B. Samuelson at Universal City, California.

Cast
 Albert Ray as Owen Wilshire
 Florence Turner as  Charmis Graham
 Maudie Dunham as Sally Lee
 William Merrick as John Wilshire

References

Bibliography
 Low, Rachael. History of the British Film, 1918-1929. George Allen & Unwin, 1971.

External links

1920 films
1920 comedy films
British comedy films
British silent feature films
1920s English-language films
Films directed by Alexander Butler
British black-and-white films
Silent comedy films
1920s British films
English-language comedy films